During the 1991–92 English football season, Brentford competed in the Football League Third Division. The club finished the season as champions to seal second-tier football for the first time since 1953–54. In 2013, it was voted as Brentford's best ever season by the club's supporters.

Season summary

After defeat to Tranmere Rovers in the 1991 Third Division play-offs, Brentford manager Phil Holder made just one addition to his squad prior to the beginning of the 1991–92 season, in the shape of £60,000 defender Billy Manuel from Gillingham. Two wins from the opening two league matches of the season put Brentford in the automatic promotion places, but three successive defeats dropped the club back to 16th by early September 1991. Aided by on-fire forward Dean Holdsworth, the Bees won 13, drew three and lost three of the following 19 matches, losing just once in the league. Having reached the top spot in the Third Division after a 4–0 victory over Wigan Athletic on 9 November, the club stayed at the summit until 8 February 1992, when a fifth defeat in 9 matches dropped the club back to third.

Brentford vied with Birmingham City and Stoke City in the automatic promotion places between mid-February and mid-March, but four successive defeats and two draws dropped the Bees back to 4th. Six wins in the final six matches of the season (which included a 4–0 victory over West London rivals Fulham at Griffin Park) saw Brentford claim the Third Division championship on the final day, after a Gary Blissett goal was enough to beat Peterborough United at London Road. Dean Holdsworth's 24 league goals tied him with Huddersfield Town's Iwan Roberts as the top scorer in the Third Division and Holdsworth's total of 38 in all competitions was one goal short of Jack Holliday's club record, set during the 1932–33 season, when Brentford had last been promoted out of the Third Division.

League table

Results
Brentford's goal tally listed first.

Legend

Pre-season

Football League Third Division

FA Cup

League Cup

Football League Trophy

 Source: Statto, 11v11, The Big Brentford Book Of The Nineties

Playing squad 
Players' ages are as of the opening day of the 1991–92 season.

 Source: The Big Brentford Book Of The Nineties

Coaching staff

Statistics

Appearances and goals
Substitute appearances in brackets.

Players listed in italics left the club mid-season.
Source: The Big Brentford Book Of The Nineties

Goalscorers 

Players listed in italics left the club mid-season.
Source: The Big Brentford Book Of The Nineties

Management

Summary

Transfers & loans

Kit

|
|

Awards 
 Supporters' Player of the Year: Keith Millen
 Football League Third Division PFA Team of the Year: Terry Evans, Dean Holdsworth
 Football League Third Division Manager of the Month: Phil Holder (November 1991, April 1992)

References

Brentford F.C. seasons
Brentford